State Route 136 (SR 136) is a north–south state highway in the southwestern portion of the U.S. state of Ohio.  Its southern terminus is at its interchange with U.S. Route 52 in Manchester and its northern terminus is at its interchange with U.S. Route 62 near Winchester.

History
SR 136 was commissioned in 1923, between SR 125 and SR 38, now US 62. The route was extended south to Manchester, in 1930.

Major intersections

References

External links

136
Transportation in Adams County, Ohio
Transportation in Highland County, Ohio